Cricket has a rich tradition of using nicknames. This is a list of nicknames used in international cricket.

Teams

Men
 Australia cricket team – The Baggy Greens-Kangaroos
 1948 tour of England – The Invincibles
 Bangladesh cricket Team –The Tigers
 England cricket team- Rival teams commonly call them "poms"
 news|url=https://www.sportstarlive.com/cricket/an-english-summer-for-virat-kohli-army-india-england-odi-series-jos-buttler/article24388966.ece|title=An English summer for Kohli's army|work=Sportstarlive|access-date=2018-07-11}}</ref> Men in Blue, The Blues
 Ireland cricket team – Green and Whites, Men in Green
 Nepal cricket team – The Gorkhas, The Rhinos
 New Zealand cricket team – The Black Caps, Kiwis
 Pakistan cricket team – Green Shirts, The Shaheens
 South Africa cricket team – The Proteas
 Sri Lanka cricket team – The Lions
 West Indies cricket team – The Men in Maroon                                             
 The Windies
 1970s to 1990- The Mighty West Indies

 Zimbabwe cricket team – The Chevrons

Women
 Australia women's cricket team – The Southern Stars
 New Zealand women's cricket team – The White Ferns
 Indian women's cricket team - Women in Blue

Officials, umpires and commentators
 Jonathan Agnew – Spiro, Aggers
 Harold Bird – Dickie
 Henry Blofeld – Blowers
 Billy Bowden – Billy
 Steve Bucknor – Slow Death Bucknor
 Bill Frindall – Bearded Wonder, Bearders
 Robin Jackman – Jackers
 Brian Johnston – Johnners
 Mpumelelo Mbangwa – Pommie
 Christopher Martin-Jenkins – CMJ
 Don Mosey – The Alderman
 Ashish Nehra – Nehra Ji
 David Shepherd – Shep
 Alan Wilkins – Wilko

Supporters
 An organised group of Australian cricket team supporters – The Fanatics
 An organised group of English cricket team supporters – Barmy Army
 An organised group of Irish cricket team supporters ― Blarney Army
 An organised group of New Zealand cricket team supporters – The Beige Brigade
 An organised group of Indian cricket team supporters – Swami Army or Bharat Army

Players
Following is arranged according to last names.

A
 Paul Adams - Gogga (Afrikaans nickname, which means 'insect')
 Shahid Afridi – Boom Boom Afridi, Lala 
 Jonathan Agnew – Aggers, Spiro
 Mushtaq Ahmed – Mushie, Jaadugar
 Saeed Ajmal – The Magician, Saeed Bhai
 Shoaib Akhtar – Rawalpindi Express
 Wasim Akram – Sultan of Swing
 Terry Alderman - The Smiling Assassin, Clem (after Clem Jones, alderman and mayor of Brisbane, curator of The Gabba)
 James Anderson – The Burnley Lara, The Burnley Express
 Warwick Armstrong – Big Ship
 Geoff Arnold – Horse
 Mohammad Ashraful – Matin
 Ravichandran Ashwin – Anna
 Mike Atherton – Athers, FEC, Cockroach, Dready, Iron Mike

B
 Trevor Bailey – The Boil, Barnacle
 David Bairstow - Bluey
 Jonny Bairstow – YJB
 Omari Banks – Bankie
 Eddie Barlow – Bunter
 Gareth Batty – Boris, Nora
 Michael Beer – Frothy
 Ian Bell – Belly, The Sherminator
 Richie Benaud – Diamonds
 Travis Birt – Edgar
 Jack Blackham - Black Jack, Prince of wicketkeepers
 Allan Border – AB, Captain Grumpy
 Ian Botham – Beefy, Guy the Gorilla
 Geoffrey Boycott – Fiery, Boycs, Thatch
 Don Bradman – The Don
 Dwayne Bravo – DJ
 Mike Brearley – Brears, Scagg
 Stuart Broad – Westlife
 Katherine Brunt – Brunty, Nunny
 Jasprit Bumrah – Boom
 Mark Butcher – Butch, Baz

C
 Andy Caddick – Des, Shack, Wingnut
 Yuzvendra Chahal – Yuzi
 Shivnarine Chanderpaul – The Chanderwall
 Ian Chappell – Chappelli
 Roston Chase – Youngross
 Dan Christian – Dan the Man
 Michael Clarke – Pup, Clarkey
 Herbie Collins – Horseshoe
 Alastair Cook – Chef, Captain Cook
 Learie Constantine – Electric Heels
 Mark Cosgrove – Cossy, Baby-Boof
 John Crawley – Creepy
 Colin Croft – Bomber
 Kate Cross – Crossy
 Martin Crowe – Hogan
 Pat Cummins – Patto, Cummo

D
 Nida Dar – Lady Boom Boom
 Ian Davis – Wizard
 Phillip DeFreitas – Daffy
 Aravinda de Silva – Mad Max
 A. B. de Villiers – ABD, Mr. 360°
 Peter Denning – Dasher
 Kapil Dev – The Haryana Hurricane
 Ted Dexter – Lord Ted
 Shikhar Dhawan – Gabbar
 M. S. Dhoni – Thala, MSD, Mahi, Captain Cool
 Graham Dilley – Pica, Dill
 Michael Di Venuto – Diva
 Basil D'Oliveira – Dolly, Bas
 Allan Donald – White Lightning
 Brett Dorey – Behemoth
 Deandra Dottin – World Boss
 J. W. H. T. Douglas – Johnny Won't Hit Today
 Rahul Dravid – The Wall
 K. S. Duleepsinhji – Duleep Mr Smith
 Sophia Dunkley – Dunks
 Mignon du Preez – Minx

E
 Phil Edmonds – Goat, Henry
 Charlotte Edwards – Lottie, Chief
 Fidel Edwards – Castro
 Matthew Elliott – Herb
 John Emburey – Embers, Ernie, Knuckle
 Farokh Engineer - Rooky, Brylcreem Boy, Dikra Farookh 
 Sean Ervine – Slug, Siuc

F
 Imran Farhat – Romi
 James Faulkner – The Finisher
 Steven Finn – The Watford Wall
 Andre Fletcher – The Spice Man
 Andrew Flintoff – Freddie
 Graeme Fowler – Foxy
 Peter Fulton – Two-metre Peter

G
 Gautam Gambhir – Gauti
 Sourav Ganguly – Prince of Kolkata, God of Offside, Dada
 Joel Garner – Big Bird
 Mike Gatting – Fat Gatt
 Sunil Gavaskar – Little master, Sunny
 Chris Gayle – World Boss, Mr. T20, Universe Boss,
 Herschelle Gibbs – Scooter
 Eddie Gilbert – Fast Eddie 
 Adam Gilchrist – Gilly, Churchy
 Ashley Giles – Gilo, Skinny, Splash, The King of Spain, Wheelie Bin
 Jason Gillespie – Dizzy
 David Gower – Stoat
 W. G. Grace – W. G., The Doctor, The Old Man, The Champion
 Rebecca Grundy – Grunners, Carol
 Umar Gul – Guldozer
 Asanka Gurusinha – Gura

H
 Brad Haddin – BJ, Hadds
 Richard Hadlee – Paddles
 Mohammad Hafeez – Professor, Professor of Sargodha
 Alex Hales – Baz
 Haseeb Hameed – Baby Boycott
 Steve Harmison – Harmy, GBH (Grievous Bodily Harmison)
 Chris Harris – Lugs
 M J Harris – Pasty
 Ryan Harris – Ryano
 Chris Hartley – Hannibal
 Ian Harvey – Harvs, The Freak
 Shane Harwood – Stickers
 John Hastings – The Duke
 Nathan Hauritz – Ritzy
 Matthew Hayden – Haydos, Big Fish
 Rachael Haynes  – Des, Dessie
 George Headley – Black Bradman
 Alyssa Healy – Midge
 Hunter Hendry – Stork
 Ben Hilfenhaus – Hilfy
 Jack Hobbs – The Master
 Brad Hodge – Hodgey, Dodgeball
 Matthew Hoggard – Oggie
 Michael Holding – Whispering Death
 James Hopes – Catfish
 A. N. Hornby – Monkey, The Boss
 Merv Hughes – Fruitfly
 Nasser Hussain – Nashwan
 David Hussey – Huss,  Bomber, Junior Mr. Cricket
 Michael Hussey – Mr Cricket, Huss

I
 Inzamam-ul-Haq – Inzi
 Bert Ironmonger – Dainty
 Tamim Iqbal – Dot Baba

J
 Ravindra Jadeja – Jaddu, Rockstar, Sir Jadeja
 Phil Jaques – Pro
 Douglas Jardine – The Iron Duke
 Sanath Jayasuriya – Matara Mauler, Master Blaster, Sana
 Gilbert Jessop – The Croucher 
 Mitchell Johnson – Midge, Notch
 Jess Jonassen – JJ
 Ernie Jones – Jonah
 Simon Jones – Horse

K
 Mohammad Kaif – Kaifu
 Romesh Kaluwitharana – Little Kalu, Little Dynamite
 Danish Kaneria – Nani-Danny
 Marizanne Kapp – Kappie
 Chamara Kapugedera – Kapu
 Dinesh Karthik – DK
 Michael Kasprowicz – Kasper
 Simon Katich – Kat
 Justin Kemp – Kempie
 Robert Key – Keysy
 Imran Khan – The Lion of Lahore
 Zaheer Khan – Zak
 Usman Khawaja – Uzzie, Captain Grumpy
 Delissa Kimmince – DK
 Michael Klinger – Maxy
 Lance Klusener - Zulu
 Heather Knight – Trev
 Alan Knott – Knotty, Flea
 Bhuvneshwar Kumar - Bhuvi, The Swing Prince
 Virat Kohli – Cheeku, King Kohli
 Nuwan Kulasekara – Kule
 Anil Kumble – Apple, Jumbo
 Kane Willamson - Cool Cat, King Kane

L
 Allan Lamb – Legga, Lambie
 Justin Langer – Alfie, JL
 Meg Lanning – Megastar, Serious Sally
 Brian Lara – The Prince of Port of Spain
 Gavin Larsen – The Postman
 V. V. S. Laxman – Very Very Special
 Bill Lawry – Phantom
 Geoff Lawson – Henry
 Darren Lehmann – Boof
 Brett Lee – Bing, Binga, The Speedster,
 H. D. G. Leveson Gower – Shrimp
 Dennis Lillee – FOT
 Clive Lloyd – Super Cat
 David Lloyd – Bumble
 Chris Lynn – Lynnsanity, Bash Brother

M
 Charles Macartney – Governor-General
 Stuart MacGill – Mac, Magilla
 Ken Mackay – Slasher
 Farveez Maharoof – Fara
 Jimmy Maher – Mahbo
 Sajid Mahmood – Saj, King
 Lasith Malinga – Malinga The Slinga, The Yorker King 
 Ashley Mallett – Rowdy
 Vic Marks – Skid, Speedy
 Charles Marriott – Father
 Mitchell Marsh – Bison
 Geoff Marsh – Swampy
 Rod Marsh – Iron Gloves, Bacchus
 Shaun Marsh – SOS
 Frederick Martin – Nutty
 Damien Martyn – Marto
 Lloyd Mash – Bangers
 Khaled Mashud – Pilot
 Angelo Mathews – Angie, Superman, Jocka
 Greg Matthews – Mo
 Glenn Maxwell – Big Show, Maxi/Maxy
 Stan McCabe – Napper
 Brendon McCullum – Bash Brother
 Bryce McGain – McGoo
 Glenn McGrath – Pigeon, Millard
 Graham McKenzie – Garth
 Brian McMillan – Big Mac
 Craig McMillan – Macca
 Colin Miller – Funky
 Keith Miller – Nugget
 Misbah-ul-Haq – Lone warrior, Tuk tuk, Man of Crisis
 Amit Mishra – Mishi
 Dave Mohammed – Tadpole
 Beth Mooney – Moons
 Roberta Moretti Avery – Big Mom
 Chris Morris – Tipo
 John Morrison – Mystery
 Mashrafe Mortaza – Koushik
 Muttiah Muralitharan – Murali
 Tim Murtagh – Dial M
 Phil Mustard – Colonel

N
 Mohammad Nabi – The President
 André Nel – Nella, Gunther
 Mfuneko Ngam – Chew
 Paul Nixon – Badger, Nico
 Monty Noble – Mary Ann
 Ashley Noffke – Noffers
 Marcus North – Snork
 Makhaya Ntini – George, Mdingi Express

O
 Iain O'Brien – Ober
 Chris Old – Chilly
 Kerry O'Keeffe – Skull
 Bill O'Reilly – Tiger

P
 Milford Page – Curly
 Shikha Pandey – Shikhipedia
 Monty Panesar – The Mont-ster, Python, The Beard to be Feared, The Sikh of Tweak
 Mansoor Ali Khan Pataudi – Tiger
 Jeetan Patel – Dave
 Ellyse Perry – Pez
 Kevin Pietersen – K. P., Kelvin, Kelv, Kapes
 Liam Plunkett – Pudsy
 Pat Pocock – Percy
 Kieron Pollard – Polly
 Peter Pollock – Pooch, The Big Dog
 Shaun Pollock – Polly
 Ricky Ponting – Punter
 Matt Prior – The Cheese

R
 Mustafizur Rahman – Fizz
 Suresh Raina – Mr. IPL, Chinna Thala
 Mark Ramprakash – Ramps
 Arjuna Ranatunga – Captain Cool
 Derek Randall – Arkle, Rags
 K. S. Ranjitsinhji – Ranji
 Abdul Razzaq – The Razzler, Bang Bang Razzaq
 Matt Renshaw – The Turtle
 Viv Richards – Smokin Joe, Smokey, King Viv, The Emperor, The Master Blaster
 Greg Ritchie – Fat Cat
 Raymond Robertson-Glasgow – Crusoe 
 Jemimah Rodrigues – Lil' J

S
 Megan Schutt – Schutter/Shooter
 Virender Sehwag – Viru, Multan ka Sultan, Nawab of Najafgarh
 Mohammad Shahzad – Mahi, M. S., Shazi
 Rohit Sharma – Hit-Man, Shana, 264
 Sandeep Sharma – Sandy
 Anya Shrubsole – Hoof
 Peter Siddle – Sid Vicious
 Jack Simmons – Flat Jack, Simmo
 Harbhajan Singh – Bhajji, Turbanator
 Mandeep Singh – Mandy
 Yuvraj Singh –Yuvi, Prince 
 E J Smith – Tiger
 Steve Smith – Smithy, Smudge, GOD
 Fred Spofforth – The Demon
 Alec Stewart – The Gaffer
 Andrew Strauss – Lord Brocket, Straussy, Levi, Muppet, Johann, Mare Man
 Washington Sundar – Washi

T
 Hugh Tayfield – Toey
 Brian Taylor – Tonker
 Mark Taylor – Tubby
 Ross Taylor – Rosco, Pallekelle Plunderer
 Sachin Tendulkar  – The God of Cricket, Little Master, Bombay Bomber, Tendlya
 Shardul Thakur - Lord Shardul, Lord 
 Jeff Thomson – Thommo, Two-Up
 Marcus Trescothick – Tresco, Banger
 Fred Trueman – Fiery
 Phil Tufnell – Tuffers, The Cat
 Alan Turner – Fitteran
 Charles Turner – The Terror
 Frank Tyson – Typhoon

U
 Derek Underwood – Deadly
Umran Malik - Jammu Express

W
 Max Walker – Tangles
 Georgia Wareham – Wolfie
 Shane Warne – Warnie, The King of Spin, The Sheikh of Tweak,
 Pelham Warner – Plum
 Mark Waugh – Afghan - the forgotten Waugh, Junior
 Steve Waugh – Tugga
 Jack White – Farmer
 Bob Willis – Goose, Dylan, Harold, Swordfish
 Paul Wilson – Blocker
 Lauren Winfield – Loz
 Chris Woakes – Wizard
 Danni Wyatt – Waggy

Y
 Suryakumar Yadav – SKY
 Bruce Yardley – Roo

Z
 Monde Zondeki – All Hands

See also
 List of cricket terms
 Lists of nicknames – nickname list articles on Wikipedia

References

Nicknames in cricket
Nicknames in cricket
Cricket
Cricket